Glitiškės Manor is a former residential manor in Glitiškės village, Vilnius District Municipality, Lithuania.

References

Manor houses in Lithuania